Indian Coffee House is a restaurant chain in India, run by a series of worker co-operative societies. It has strong presence across India with nearly 400 coffee houses. It has been a hub for Communist and Socialist movements for generations. Thus it has played a very important role in the politics of India.

History
Coffee had been grown in India by native Indians since the 16th century. However, the concept of coffee houses began to gain a little popularity in the 18th century in Madras and Calcutta. However, as part of the racial discrimination policy of the British rulers, native Indians were not allowed into these coffee houses, which were mainly Europeans-only establishments. During the late 1890s, the idea of an "India Coffee House" chain was formed.

The India Coffee House chain was started by the Coffee Cess Committee, the first outlet – then named ‘India Coffee House’ – opened in Churchgate, Bombay in 1936, and was operated by the Indian Coffee Board. In the course of the 1940s there were nearly 50 Coffee Houses all over British India. Post partition, Pakistan inherited the branches of Indian Coffee Houses in its major cities and continued the coffee house legacy as a social place in fostering intellectual discussions.

In India, due to a change in the policy in the mid-1950s, the Coffee Board decided to close down the Coffee Houses. Encouraged by the communist leader A. K. Gopalan (AKG), the workers of the Coffee Board began a movement and compelled the Coffee Board to agree to hand over the outlets to the workers who then formed Indian Coffee Workers' Co-operatives and renamed the network as Indian Coffee House. A co-operative began in Bangalore on 19 August 1957, and one was established in Delhi on 27 December 1957. Later Bellary and Madras Societies were separated from their mother societies.. Malviya Marg Karam Chand Chowk Branch, Jabalpur serves as the head office of ICWCS. In October 2018, Indian Coffee House opened its 8th branch of Jabalpur.

Management
There are 13 co-operative societies in the country to run the coffee houses. These societies are governed by managing committees elected from the employees. The societies affiliated under All India Coffee Workers' Co- operative Societies Federation formed 17 December 1960.

Branches

Kerala
There are two societies in Kerala.
India Coffee Board Workers' Co-operative Society Ltd. No.4227, Thrissur: Established on 10 February 1958.The first Indian Coffee House opened at Thrissur on 8 March 1958. It was also the fourth ICH in the country. The society have more than 50 branches across Thrissur, Ernakulam, Idukki, Kottayam, Pathanamthitta, Alappuzha, Kollam and Thiruvananthapuram.

Advocate T. K. Krishnan, a Communist Leader of Thrissur and N. S. Parameswaran Pillai, the State Secretary of the India Coffee Board Labour Union and a thrown-out employee of ICH were the founders of ICHs in Kerala.

Indian Coffee Workers' Co-operative Society Ltd. No. 4317, Kannur: Established on 2 July 1958. The first Indian Coffee House started on 7 August 1958 in Thalasserry. The society have more than 25 branches across Kasaragod, Kannur, Kozhikode, Malappuram and Palakkad districts.

There is also a book about the ICH movement, in Malayalam - Coffee Housinte Katha or History of Coffee House by N. S. Parameswaran Pillai under the pen name, Nadakkal Parameswaran Pillai (Published by Current Books, Thrissur). This is the only published written history of ICH movement in any language. The book won the Abudhabi Shakthi Award as the best autobiography in 2007.

Coffee House outlets in Kerala are noted for their extensive use of beetroot in their dishes.

West Bengal
The Indian Coffee House has several branches in Kolkata, including the College Street branch, Central Avenue branch, Medical College Kolkata branch and Jadavpur branch. These are favourite hang-out places among the students and youth, although one can see several old-timers frequenting the coffee houses on a regular basis.

Coffee House at College Street

The most famous Coffee House branch in Kolkata is the one at the College Street, also known as the "Coffee House at College Street". Though popularly known as College Street Coffee house, this branch is actually on Bankim Chatterjee Street.

The history of the Coffee House at College Street can be traced to Albert Hall, which was founded in April 1876. Later, the Coffee Board decided to start a coffee joint from the Albert Hall in 1942. Notable citizens, including Aparna Sen and Sunil Gangopadhyay, were frequent visitors to the place. In 1947, the Central Government changed the name of the place to "Coffee House". The place became a meeting place for poets, artistes, literati and people from the world of art and culture. The coffee house is famous for its adda sessions, and as the breeding place of several political and cultural personalities and movements. A famous song "Coffee House-er Sei Adda-ta" (কফি হাউসের সেই আড্ডাটা), sung by Manna Dey is based on this Coffee House.

Chhattisgarh

The Indian Coffee House has multiple restaurants in Chhattisgarh's Urban centres such as Raipur, Korba, Durg, Bhilai, Bilaspur, Raigarh and Jagdalpur

Chandigarh
The Indian Coffee House branch in Sector 17 of Chandigarh was opened in 1964 and remained popular among professionals, journalists, doctors, bureaucrats, lawyers and senior officials. The branch originally operated in Sector 22, and was shifted to Sector 17 in 1971. The Coffee House on the Punjab University campus is popular among students. In 2016, a new branch was opened in Sector 36. ICH Sector 17 was opened in 1969. The Sector 22 ICH was shifted near fountain and now shifted to Kusumpti near Shimla. The Panjab University Student Center was subletted to few ex ICH employees to run the coffee house and not a branch of ICH. ICH has its HQs at Janpath New Delhi.

Himachal Pradesh
The Indian Coffee House branch in Dharamsala used to be a popular hang-out of intelligentsia in the city. It was set up, after the district administration approached the Indian Coffee Workers' Co-operative Society, Delhi in 1991. The society decided to close it down in 2006, after losses ran over 3.5 million rupees. Indian Coffee House has a branch in Shimla.

Madhya Pradesh
Indian Coffee Workers' Co-operative Society Ltd, Jabalpur

There are more than 35 branches in Madhya Pradesh with more than 10 branches alone in the pioneering city of Jabalpur. The Malviya Marg Branch in Jabalpur is the Head Office of ICWCS. The Indian Coffee House is a popular hang-out of Students in the city. Some of the old branches still please the age old people. These have been a popular celebration, meeting points since decades. The food of Madhya Pradesh is available in Jabalpur.

Karnataka

The 50-year-old Indian Coffee House at M. G. Road in Bangalore closed on 5 April 2009, after the Indian Coffee Workers' Cooperative Society Limited lost a legal battle with the owner of the building to continue in the premises. It has been reopened on Church Street, less than a hundred metres away. Another is at Koramangala opposite to Jyoti Nivas College. Four branches of Indian Coffee House are operating at Christ University's Main Campus on Hosur Road, Bannerghatta road and at Kengeri Campus.

Rajasthan
There are 2 branches in Jaipur: M.I. Road and Jawahar Kala Kendra.

Pakistan 
Pakistan also inherited Indian coffee houses post-partition with main branches in Karachi and Lahore that underwent change in ownership and were rebranded after independence in 1947. Other coffee houses were also established, notably Pioneer Coffee House in Karachi by Sheriff Merchant, a former member of the Indian Coffee Board who also served as the Manager of the Indian Coffee House in Karachi after the independence of Pakistan.

See also

 A. K. Gopalan
 List of coffeehouse chains
 Nadakkal Parameswaran Pillai
 Worker cooperative

References

External links

 Official website of the Indian Coffee Workers' Co-operative Society Limited, Jabalpur
 Official website of Indian Coffee Workers' Co-operative Society Limited, Kannur
 Official website of India Coffee Board Workers' Co-operative Society, Thrissur

Restaurant chains in India
Cooperatives in India
Regional restaurant chains
Worker cooperatives of India
Coffeehouses and cafés in India
1958 establishments in Kerala